Almyros or Halmyros is a town and a municipality of the regional unit of Magnesia, region of Thessaly, Greece. It lies in the center of prosperous fertile plain known as 'Krokio Pedio', which is crossed by torrents. Almyros is an important agricultural and commercial center of Magnesia, and is also developing as a tourist center for the area. The main agricultural products are tomatoes, cotton, wheat, almonds, peanuts and pistachio nuts.

History

The history of Almyros begins with the ancient city of Alos (about 10 km [6.2 mi] south of Almyros), the ruins of which can still be visited. Alos was a very important and populous town, famous for its port and for its role in the Persian Wars. After the Byzantine Empire, because of pirate raids, they built the town in the place that it is today.

Halmyros was the site of the decisive Battle of Halmyros on 15 March 1311, where the Catalan Company shattered the assembled feudal armies of Frankish Greece and conquered the Duchy of Athens.

In 1838, the settlement was described as being "a Turkish town, situated on the western coast of the Pagasitic Gulf, half an hour's journey inland, on the Plain of Krokios, and consisting of some 300 dwellings. It is chiefly inhabited by Turks, with only a few Christian settlers, who cultivate the lands of the Turks residing there". The Ottoman Empire ceded most of Thessaly in 1881, followed by development and repopulation by Greeks.

In 1980 a catastrophic magnitude 6.5 earthquake destroyed most of the town.

Municipality
The municipality Almyros was formed at the 2011 local government reform by the merger of the following 4 former municipalities, that became municipal units:
Almyros
Anavra
Pteleos
Sourpi

The municipality has an area of 905.4 km2 (349.6 sq mi), the municipal unit 473.940 km2 (183 sq mi).

Subdivisions
The municipal unit of Almyros is divided into the following communities: Almyros, Efxeinoupoli, Anthotopos, Kokkotoi, Kroki, Kofoi, Platanos, and Fylaki.

Province
The province of Almyros was one of the provinces of Magnesia. It had the same territory as the present municipality. It was abolished in 2006.

Landmarks
The Archaeological Museum of Almyros includes local artifacts and exhibits from the Neolithic period, through Mycenean, Geometric, Classical, Hellenistic periods, and later Roman years. Opposite the museum is the old High School, the Gymnasium of Almyros, which is a classic monumental building from the beginning of the 20th century. The Museum and Gymnasium are the oldest buildings in the area.
The Kouri forest, about 2 km from the town of Almyros, at an elevation of 75 m (246 ft), encompasses 108 ha (266.9 acres) of lowland oak forest. The forest is flat (elevation gradient is less than 2%). Oaks belong to the species: Quercus pubescens, Quercus aegilops, Quercus pedunculiflora. There are footpaths, as well as a miniature train for a brief tour through the woods and over small bridges.
The area is important to migratory birds, such as the mute swan, spoonbill, glossy ibis, and various herons.
South of the town are the moderately wooded Othrys mountains. 17 km (10.6 mi) from the town of Almyros but still in Almyros province, high in the Othrys mountains, is the 12th century Monastery of Panagia Xenia, with wall paintings, treasuries, and a library.
There are several sandy beaches in the municipality of Almyros.
Almyros has three main churches: Agios Dimitrios, Agios Nikolaos and Evangelistria.

Geography
Almyros is situated near the western end of the Pagasetic Gulf, 25 km (15.5 mi) southwest of Volos. Motorway 1 (Athens – Thessaloniki) passes east of the town Almyros.

Climate

Historical population

References

External links

Almyros Newspaper
Agios Dimitrios Church in Almyros TrekEarth. Site includes several dozen photographs in and around Almyros, including the Kouri forest, Monastery of Panagia Xenia, and Almyros beach.
The Jewish Community of Volos "KIS, the Central Board of Jewish Communities in Greece" website. Includes history of Jewish communities in the Almyros region.

Populated places in Magnesia (regional unit)
Municipalities of Thessaly
Provinces of Greece